Bryan Roper' (born 14 July 1993 in Glendale, AZ, United States), is an American International motorcycle trials rider.

Biography
In 2010 Roper finished 2nd in the NATC Expert series after being runner up to eventual winner Ray Peters at seven rounds. He switched to the Pro class for the final round in California, finishing in 5th place.

His first full season in the NATC Pro class was 2011, a season in which he was consistent and finished 4th overall, his best ride being a 3rd place at the final round in Tennessee. He was selected as a member of the US Trial des Nations team alongside Karl Davis Jr, Eric Storz and Andrew Oldar. The event was held in Tolmezzo, Italy.

2012 was a similar story, 4th overall at seasons end with podium finishes at the California, Ohio and both Rhode Island events. He also competed successfully in Endurocross during the season.

Roper's best season to date was 2013, finishing second in the NATC Pro series to defending champion Patrick Smage after taking 2nd and 3rd places in New York, and runner-up twice in both Vermont and Arizona. Roper never finished off the podium all season. He also competed in the FIM Junior World Championship US rounds, taking a pair of 14th place point scoring finishes. 

Only contesting the final four rounds of the 2014 NATC series, due to World Championship obligations, Roper finished 5th in the Pro championship, his best score being a pair of 3rd places in Pennsylvania.
The FIM Junior World Championship Spanish round produced a 14th place finish.

More International events during 2015 brought Roper home in 15th place in the FIM Junior World Championship. Best scores were 8th and 7th at the US round, with more point scoring finishes in Czechoslovakia, Sweden and Portugal. On the home front Roper finished 3rd in the NATC Pro series, best finishes of 2nd in both Texas and Arizona.

In the newly renamed 2016 FIM Trial 2 World Championship, Roper scored 11th and 10th at the opening Spanish rounds.

Roper switched from Sherco and joined Geoff Aaron's Gas-Gas US national team at the start of the 2017 season. Competing as a member of the US Trial des Nations team, Roper, Patrick Smage and Daniel Blanc-Gonnet finished 2nd in the Trophy class to the Australian squad. Roper finished 4th in the NATC Pro series, and also won the prestigious Trial de Espana event in California.

National Trials Championship Career

International Trials Championship Career

Honors

Related Reading
NATC Trials Championship
FIM Trial European Championship
FIM Trial World Championship

References 

1993 births
Living people
American motorcycle racers
Motorcycle trials riders